MSRI may refer to:

 Malaysian Social Research Institute, Kuala Lumpur, assists refugees 
 Mathematical Sciences Research Institute, California, undertakes research in mathematics